David Odonkor (born 21 February 1984) is a German footballer who plays as a right winger. He plays for the amateur side SC Düsseldorf-West II.

He started playing professionally with Borussia Dortmund, appearing in 90 competitive matches. In the later part of his career, spent mostly with Betis. He was plagued by constant injuries, but is known for his top speed and acceleration.

Odonkor represented the Germany national team in one World Cup and one European Championship.

Club career

Borussia Dortmund
Odonkor was born in Bünde, North Rhine-Westphalia, to a German mother and a Ghanaian father. A product of Borussia Dortmund's youth ranks, he made his first-team debut on 3 March 2002, having recently turned 18, coming on as a second-half substitute in a 1–1 home draw against FC St. Pauli. After splitting the following season with the first and second teams he was definitely promoted for 2003–04, helping Borussia to a final sixth place in the Bundesliga.

In the 2005–06 season Odonkor was everpresent, only missing one league game. On 26 November 2005, he scored and assisted alike in a 2–1 success at 1. FC Nürnberg and, subsequently, he attracted attention from Real Betis, eventually signing for a €6 million fee. He left Borussia after two additional appearances in the 2006–07 season.

Real Betis
Odonkor's first season at Betis was unassuming, as he appeared in only 13 La Liga matches due to a serious knee injury. The second year began promisingly, but another knee ailment forced him out for another three months.

Upon his return Odonkor appeared regularly for the Andalusians, mainly from the bench. On 4 May 2008, as a starter, he scored his first goal in a 1–1 away draw against UD Almería; in July, after returning to Germany for surgery, he was forced to sign a document by club owner Manuel Ruiz de Lopera by which his contract could inclusively be unilaterally terminated if he returned later than expected.

Having made his way back into the German squad and the Betis starting lineup, Odonkor would however undergo surgery on his knee for a third time in the country, only being reinstated during the 2008–09 winter transfer window. Late into 2009, with the side now in the second division, he relapsed again and missed the remainder of the season.

Betis returned to the Spanish top flight at the end of 2010–11, but Odonkor played no part in the club's campaign, again due to injury.

Later years
On 28 July 2011, Odonkor arrived at Scottish Premier League side Rangers for a week-long trial, after his contract at Betis came to an end. However, he was ultimately not given a deal, and returned to his country after five years, signing with Alemannia Aachen in the second level.

In the 2012 summer, after his team's relegation, Odonkor moved to FC Hoverla Uzhhorod in the Ukrainian Premier League. In September 2013, after another lengthy injury layoff, the 29-year-old retired from football.

International career
Odonkor was involved in two UEFA European Under-16 Championship editions, 2000 and 2001, managing to score against Romania in the latter, an 8–2 win. On both occasions Germany lost in the quarter-finals, on penalty shootouts.

After appearing at under-19 level, Odonkor would nonetheless be left out of the under-21 squad that appeared at Euro 2006 in Portugal, due to having received a surprise call-up by Jürgen Klinsmann for the 2006 FIFA World Cup. He made his full debut on 30 May 2006 in a friendly match with Japan, going on to appear as a substitute in four World Cup games, most notably against Poland in the group stage where he displayed an excellent performance and assisted Oliver Neuville's winning goal in stoppage time.

Despite his problems with injuries at Betis, Odonkor was called up to UEFA Euro 2008 by Joachim Löw, where he featured 45 minutes in the 1–2 loss to Croatia. Overall he won sixteen caps for Germany.

Career statistics
Scores and results list Germany's goal tally first, score column indicates score after each Odonkor goal.

Honours
Borussia Dortmund
Bundesliga: 2001–02

Germany
UEFA European Championship runner-up: 2008
FIFA World Cup third place: 2006

References

External links

1984 births
Living people
People from Herford (district)
Sportspeople from Detmold (region)
German sportspeople of Ghanaian descent
German footballers
Footballers from North Rhine-Westphalia
Association football wingers
Bundesliga players
2. Bundesliga players
Borussia Dortmund players
Borussia Dortmund II players
Alemannia Aachen players
La Liga players
Segunda División players
Real Betis players
Ukrainian Premier League players
FC Hoverla Uzhhorod players
Germany international footballers
Germany under-21 international footballers
Germany youth international footballers
2006 FIFA World Cup players
UEFA Euro 2008 players
German expatriate footballers
Expatriate footballers in Spain
Expatriate footballers in Ukraine
German expatriate sportspeople in Spain
German expatriate sportspeople in Ukraine
German football managers